Parbhu Govan Nana (born 17 August 1933, date of death unknown) was an East African cricketer. He was a Zambian of Indian origin. 

Nana played three One day Internationals in the 1975 World Cup. He died sometime between 2009, when he visited New Zealand, and 2019, when it was reported that he had died "some years ago".

References

 Parbhu Nana Profile and Details at ZambiaCricket.Org

1933 births
Year of death missing
East African cricketers
East Africa One Day International cricketers
Zambian cricketers
Indian emigrants to Zambia
Cricketers at the 1975 Cricket World Cup